The 2014 FIBA Asia Champions Cup will be the 25th staging of the FIBA Asia Champions Cup, the international basketball club tournament of FIBA Asia. The tournament was supposed to be held in Kuwait on June 5–13, 2014, but FIBA Asia, through a communique to the National Federations representing the qualified teams, had announced that the tournament will be rescheduled after the 2014 FIBA Asia Under-18 Championship for Women sometime in the third-fourth week of October, after they (National Federations) mentioned that they require their top players to be available for the National Team’s preparations for the 2014 FIBA Basketball World Cup and the 2014 Asian Games.

Qualification
The qualifications for the 2014 FIBA Asia Champions Cup are still ongoing; it started this early 2014 with the Gulf region, West Asia, Southeast Asia, East Asia, Central Asia and South Asia each conducting tournaments.

Format 
The following are eligible to participate:

 The organizing country.
 The three best-placed teams from the 2013 FIBA Asia Champions Cup will qualify the same number of teams from their respective sub-zones.
 The best team from the sub-zones of East Asia, Gulf, Southeast Asia and West Asia and the winner from the sub-zones of South Asia and Central Asia.

Berths

2013 FIBA Asia Champions Cup

Qualified teams

Central Asia
Turkmenistan's Belent Ashgabat will be the CABA subzone's representative to the 2014 FIBA Asia Champions Cup.

East Asia

Persian Gulf
Qatar's Al-Sadd and UAE's Al-Ahli have qualified to represent Gulf subzone, and a team representing Kuwait has qualified automatically as the hosts.

South Asia

Southeast Asia
The 2014 SEABA Champions Cup was the qualification for Southeast Asia in the 2014 FIBA Asia Champions Cup. It was a single game between Malaysia and Singapore and was held on April 26, 2014, in Kuala Lumpur, Malaysia. After intense and hard-fought three quarters, the home team pulled out a 17–9 scoring in the final frame to claim the lone SEABA spot, 59–47.

West Asia
The 2014 WABA Champions Cup was the qualifying tournament for the 2014 FIBA Asia Champions Cup. The three best teams  qualify for 2014 FIBA Asia Champions Cup. The tournament was held from March 8 to March 13, 2014 in Tehran, Iran.

Preliminary round

Group A

Group B

Final round

Quarterfinals

Semifinals

3rd place

Final

Final standing

References

2014
FIBA Asia Champions Cup
Champions Cup
International basketball competitions hosted by Kuwait